The following article is a summary of the 2008–09 football season in Australia, which was the 4th competitive season since the restructuring of the domestic system and commencement of the A-League.

Domestic leagues

A-League

Regular season

Finals series

W-League

Regular season

Finals series

National Youth League

Regular season

Grand Final

Domestic cups

A-League Pre-Season Challenge Cup

Group A

Group B

Final

International club competitions

FIFA Club World Cup

Adelaide United

AFC Champions League

Central Coast Mariners

Newcastle Jets

National teams

Men's senior

Friendlies

FIFA World Cup qualification

AFC Asian Cup qualification

Men's under-23

Friendlies

Olympics

Men's under-20

Friendlies

AFF U-19 Youth Championship

AFC U-19 Championship

Men's under-17

Friendlies

AFF U-16 Youth Championship

AFC U-16 Championship

Women's senior

Friendlies

AFF Women's Championship

Women's under-20

Friendlies

AFC U-19 Women's Championship qualification

Women's under-17

AFC U-16 Women's Championship qualification

References

External links
 Football Federation Australia official website

 
 
Seasons in Australian soccer